The 1956 United States elections was held on Tuesday, November 6, 1956. The election saw no major change in power as the Republicans defended the presidency and the Democrats retained control of Congress.

In the presidential election, Republican President Dwight D. Eisenhower defeated Democratic former Governor Adlai E. Stevenson of Illinois in a re-match of the 1952 election. Eisenhower won the popular vote by fifteen points and once again won every state outside the South. At the Democratic convention, Stevenson easily defeated New York Governor W. Averell Harriman, taking the nomination on the first ballot.

In the Senate, the party balance of the chamber remained unchanged as Republican and Democratic gains cancelled each other out. In the House, the Democrats picked up two seats, increasing their majority.

See also
 1956 United States presidential election
 1956 United States House of Representatives elections
 1956 United States Senate elections
 1956 United States gubernatorial elections

References

 
1956